The Treaty of Jassy, signed at Jassy (Iași) in Moldavia (presently in Romania), was a pact between the Russian and Ottoman Empires ending the Russo-Turkish War of 1787–92 and confirming Russia's increasing dominance in the Black Sea.

The treaty was signed on 9 January 1792 by Grand Vizier Koca Yusuf Pasha and Prince Bezborodko (who had succeeded Prince Potemkin as the head of the Russian delegation when Potemkin died). The Treaty of Jassy formally recognized the Russian Empire's annexation of the Crimean Khanate via the Treaty of Küçük Kaynarca of 1774 and transferred Yedisan (the territory between Dniester and Bug rivers) to Russia making the Dniester the Russo-Turkish frontier in Europe, and leaving the Asiatic frontier (Kuban River) unchanged.

See also
List of treaties

References

1790s in the Russian Empire
1792 in the Ottoman Empire
1792 in Europe
1792 treaties
Crimean Khanate
History of Iași
Jassy
Jassy
Russo-Turkish wars
Ottoman Empire–Russia treaties